Drummond Castle is located in Perthshire, Scotland. The castle is known for its gardens, described by Historic Environment Scotland as "the best example of formal terraced gardens in Scotland." The castle comprises a tower house built in the late 15th century, and a 17th-century mansion, both of which were rebuilt in Victorian times. The gardens date to the 1630s, although they too were restructured in the 19th century. The formal gardens are protected as a category A listed building, and are included on the Inventory of Gardens and Designed Landscapes in Scotland. The tower house and mansion are both category B listed.

History
The lands of Drummond were the property of the Drummond family from the 14th century, and the original tower house was built over several years by John Drummond, 1st Lord Drummond of Cargill, from about 1490. In 1605 the 4th Lord Drummond was created Earl of Perth, and added to the castle. John Drummond, 2nd Earl of Perth, laid out the first terraced garden around the castle in the 1630s.

The castle was sacked by the army of Oliver Cromwell in 1653, during the Wars of the Three Kingdoms. James Drummond, 4th Earl of Perth, was Lord Chancellor of Scotland under King James VII. He began the mansion house in 1689, before being imprisoned following the deposition of King James by William of Orange. He later fled to the exiled Jacobite court in France. The Drummonds continued to support the Jacobite cause in the Jacobite uprisings of 1715 and 1745. The family retained control of the estate until 1750, when the Drummond properties were declared forfeit and seized by the Crown. The estate was managed by the Commissioners for Forfeited Estates until 1784, when it was sold to Captain James Drummond (later created 1st Baron Perth). He began a number of improvements that were continued by his daughter Sarah and her husband, Peter Drummond-Burrell, 22nd Baron Willoughby de Eresby (1782–1865). These included the formal gardens and terraces in the 1830s. Queen Victoria visited the gardens in 1842.

Drummond Castle passed to Clementina Drummond-Willoughby, 24th Baroness Willoughby de Eresby (1809–1888), and then to her son, the Earl of Ancaster (1830–1910). The upper stories of the tower house were rebuilt and heightened in pseudo-medieval style in 1842–53. The mansion was renovated in 1878, to designs by George Turnbull Ewing. James Heathcote-Drummond-Willoughby, 3rd Earl of Ancaster, and his wife, Nancy Astor (1909–1975; she was the daughter of The 2nd Viscount Astor and Viscountess Astor), replanted the gardens in the 1950s. The castle is now the seat of Jane Heathcote-Drummond-Willoughby, 28th Baroness Willoughby de Eresby, the daughter and heiress of the 3rd Earl of Ancaster. As of early 2021, she was still the owner of the estate. The castle (not open to visitors) and the gardens are managed by the Grimsthorpe and Drummond Castle Trust.

Description
The castle is set on part of a prominent spine of rock known as the Gask Ridge, a geographical feature that stretches several kilometres across Perthshire, but is particularly prominent and steep-sided at the site of the castle. The tower house, or keep, is no longer used as a dwelling. It is adjoined by a later, but better preserved, gatehouse (built 1629–30). Stretching between the tower house and the edge of the ridge, it was originally intended to control access to the courtyard behind, which has a fine view over the formal gardens.  To the south of the castle on its rocky outcrop are the formal gardens.

The buildings and gardens of Drummond Castle featured as backdrops in the 1995 film Rob Roy.

Gardens

The Drummond Castle Gardens website indicates that gardens may have been in this location since the late 1400s, and that a major transformation was completed (of both gardens and castle) between 1630–1636. The current layout was started in the 1830s, based on a design by Lewis Kennedy, after Clementina Drummond and her husband Peter Robert Willoughby inherited the estate from her father. Queen Victoria and Prince Albert visited the garden in 1842.

Originally encompassing twelve acres, the garden was downsized after the Second World War. The parterre exhibits the Drummond family coat of arms: "Scots thistles and daggers, and its traversing paths create a saltire, centering on a recently restored stone sundial dating from 1630". In the TV series Outlander, the gardens were used to represent the formal garden at the Palace of Versailles as it might have appeared in the time of Louis XV. Because of the worldwide COVID-19 pandemic, the gardens did not open to the public as they have in other years during Easter and between May and October.

According to Visit Scotland, "Drummond Gardens are some of Scotland’s most important formal gardens and are among the finest in Europe". The agency's website adds that the gardens were "redesigned and terraced in the 19th century, the gardens you see today were replanted in the 1950s".

Gallery

References

External links

Drummond Castle Gardens website
Gazetteer for Scotland
Flickr images tagged Drummond Castle
Engraving of Drummond castle by James Fittler in the digitised copy of Scotia Depicta, or the antiquities, castles, public buildings, noblemen and gentlemen's seats, cities, towns and picturesque scenery of Scotland, 1804 at National Library of Scotland

Castles in Perth and Kinross
Scottish baronial architecture
Inventory of Gardens and Designed Landscapes
Category A listed buildings in Perth and Kinross
Listed castles in Scotland
Gardens in Perth and Kinross
Tower houses in Scotland